Christopher Akintola Ogungbe (1934 – November 2012) was a Nigerian film actor, filmmaker, producer and director.

Early life and career
He was born in 1934 at Abeokuta, the capital of Ogun State, southwestern Nigeria where he later died on November 2012.
His mother took him to live with his grandmother after he stopped schooling, at first he went to learn to tailor He started by watching Baba GT Onimole as an apprentice, according to his brother his first play was title "a terrible life"and his stage name is Baba Ibeji. He had featured, directed and produced several Nigerian films such as Ireke Onibudo and  50-50, a movie produced in 1990 that featured the veteran comic actor Bolaji Amusan.

Personal life
He had 20 wives and 50 children, among his children is a Nigerian film actor, director and producer, Segun Ogungbe.

Selected filmography
50-50 (1990)Ireke Onibudo''
Asiri Baba Ibeji
Ologbo Jigolo
Lisabi
Igba funfun

See also
 List of Nigerian film producers
List of Yoruba people

References

1934 births
Nigerian male film actors
Yoruba male actors
Nigerian film directors
Nigerian film producers
2012 deaths
Male actors from Abeokuta
Male actors in Yoruba cinema
20th-century Nigerian male actors
Nigerian male television actors
20th-century births